The Peterborough Victoria Northumberland and Clarington Catholic District School Board (known as English-language Separate District School Board No. 41 prior to 1999) is the Catholic English school board for the region and is headquartered in Peterborough, Ontario, Canada.

The Peterborough Victoria Northumberland and Clarington Catholic District School Board has 30 elementary schools and six secondary schools to serve its urban and rural communities.

Schools

Elementary
Good Shepherd Elementary School, Courtice
Holy Family Elementary School, Bowmanville
Immaculate Conception Elementary School, Peterborough
Monsignor Leo Cleary Elementary School, Courtice
Monsignor O'Donoghue Elementary School, Peterborough
Mother Teresa Elementary School, Courtice
Notre Dame Elementary School, Cobourg
St. John Paul II Elementary School, Lindsay
St. Alphonsus Elementary School, Peterborough
St. Anne Elementary School, Peterborough
St. Anthony Elementary School, Port Hope
St. Catherine Elementary School, Peterborough
St. Dominic Elementary School, Lindsay
St. Elizabeth Elementary School, Bowmanville
St. Francis of Assisi Elementary School, Newcastle
St. John Catholic Elementary School, Peterborough
St. Joseph Elementary School, Bowmanville
St. Joseph Elementary School, Cobourg
St. Joseph Elementary School, Douro
St. Luke Elementary School, Lindsay
St. Martin Elementary School, Ennismore
St. Mary Elementary School, Grafton
St. Mary Elementary School, Lindsay
St. Mary Elementary School, Port Hope
St. Michael Elementary School, Cobourg
St. Patrick Elementary School, Peterborough
St. Paul Elementary School, Lakefield
St. Paul Elementary School, Norwood
St. Paul Elementary School, Peterborough
St. Teresa Elementary School, Peterborough

Secondary
Holy Cross Secondary School, Peterborough
Holy Trinity Secondary School, Courtice
St. Mary's Secondary School, Cobourg
St. Peter's Secondary School, Peterborough
St. Stephen's Secondary School, Bowmanville
St. Thomas Aquinas Secondary School, Lindsay

Students
 10,015 Elementary students
 4,608 Secondary students
Total of 14,623

Statistics
Facts and figures - 2015/2016
 30 elementary schools
 6 secondary schools
 1,934 employees
 Academic staff - 915
 Occasional academic staff - 360
 Support staff (CUPE) - 558
 Administration (includes supervisory officers, administrative support, principals and vice-principals) - 101
 Trustees - 7

See also
List of school districts in Ontario
List of high schools in Ontario

References

External links
 

Roman Catholic school districts in Ontario